Squad of Girls (Persian: دسته دختران, romanized: Dastee Dokhtaran) is a 2022 Iranian war drama film directed by Monir Gheidi and written by Gheidi, Milad Akbarnejad and Ebrahim Amini. it revolves around the Battle of Khorramshahr of 1980. The film screened for the first time at the 40th Fajr Film Festival where it won an award, a honorary diploma and earned 5 nominations.

Premise 
the movie shows the resistance and self-sacrifice of women in the early days of the war, and by reconstructing live and documentary images of the house-to-house battle in Khorramshahr, has created the first cinematic image of that resistance from a female perspective.

Cast 

 Niki Karimi  as Yeganeh Kamayi
 Pantea Panahiha  as Vajihe
 Fereshteh Hosseini  as Simin
 Hoda Zeinolabedin as Fereshteh
 Sadaf Asgari as Azar
 Hossein Soleimani as Soldier
 Mehdi Hosseininia as Vajihe's Husband
 Yasin Masoudi 
 Mohammad Sadigi Mehr

Reception

Critical response

Accolades

References

External links 

 

2020s Persian-language films
2022 drama films
2022 films
Iranian drama films